The 1988–89 Scottish Cup was the 104th staging of Scotland's most prestigious football knockout competition. The Cup was won by Celtic who defeated Rangers in the final.

First round

Replays

Second round

Replays

Third round

Replays

Fourth round

Replays

Second Replays

Quarter-finals

Replays

Semi-finals

Replays

Final

References

See also
1988–89 in Scottish football
1988–89 Scottish League Cup

Scottish Cup seasons
Scottish Cup, 1988-89
Scot